Cyme sexualis is a moth of the subfamily Arctiinae first described by Felder in 1864. It is found on Ambon, Sulawesi, the Dampier Archipelago. and in New Guinea.

References

Nudariina
Moths of Asia